The 2000–01 Butler Bulldogs men's basketball team represented Butler University in the 2000–01 NCAA Division I men's basketball season. Their head coach was Thad Matta, serving in his 1st season as head coach at the school. The Bulldogs played their home games at Hinkle Fieldhouse as members of the Midwestern Collegiate Conference. Butler finished first in the MCC season standings and won the MCC tournament to receive the conference’s automatic bid to the NCAA tournament – the school’s fourth NCAA Tournament appearance in five years. As No. 10 seed in the Midwest region, the Bulldogs took down No. 7 seed , 79–63, in the opening round, before falling to No. 2 seed Arizona in the second round. For the second straight season, Butler lost to the eventual National runner-up. Butler finished the season with a record of 24–8 (11–3 MCC).

Roster

Schedule and results

|-
!colspan=9 style=| Regular season

|-
!colspan=9 style=| MCC tournament

|-
!colspan=9 style=| NCAA tournament

References

Butler
Butler Bulldogs men's basketball seasons
Butler
Butler Bulldogs men's basketball
Butler Bulldogs men's basketball